"Destiny Calling" is the twenty-first episode of the third season, the first part of the two-part season finale, and 65th episode overall from the Fox series Gotham. The show is itself based on the characters created by DC Comics set in the Batman mythology. The episode was written by executive producer Danny Cannon and directed by Nathan Hope. It was first broadcast on June 5, 2017.

In the episode, Gotham is currently in chaos with most of the citizens getting infected with the Tetch virus. While Gordon struggles to contain the virus inside him, he and Bullock continue looking for an antidote. They plan on having Hugo Strange develop the antidote but they find that he has been taken by Fish Mooney's gang for their own purposes. However, Nygma and Barbara also want the antidote in order to remain their claim over the city but Butch and Tabitha are planning on betraying them. Meanwhile, Bruce finally comes face to face with the man he was looking for: Ra's al Ghul.

Plot
Gotham City is falling into chaos with nearly all citizens getting infected with the Tetch virus. In the GCPD, Gordon (Ben McKenzie), Bullock (Donal Logue) and Alfred (Sean Pertwee) begin interrogating Bruce (David Mazouz) in an attempt to destroy the Shaman's brainwash.

Fox (Chris Chalk) informs them about an antidote that has been designed by Hugo Strange (B. D. Wong). Gordon and Bullock arrive at the train station in order to stop Strange from leaving Gotham but Strange is taken by Fish Mooney (Jada Pinkett Smith). Gordon and Bullock surround Fish and try to get back Strange but Victor Fries (Nathan Darrow) arrives and creates an ice barrier that lets them escape while an infected Gordon slams the barrier. Meanwhile, Nygma (Cory Michael Smith) and Barbara (Erin Richards) set to find Cobblepot (Robin Lord Taylor) to kill him. Alfred tries to save Bruce from the brainwashing but it fails and Bruce even comments that the Court is just paving the way for "the one to come".

During riots in the police department, Bruce manages to escape his cell and sets to find the building the Shaman instructed him to go. Meanwhile, Butch (Drew Powell) and Tabitha (Jessica Lucas) considered to conspire with Fish in order to help her kill Barbara and Nygma. Strange is brought to Dahl Manor where Cobblepot puts the same device that he was put in Arkham Asylum in order to develop the antidote. Cobblepot and Strange meet with Fish, Fries and Bridgit (Camila Perez) in a slaughterhouse in order to get the antidote. Suddenly, members of the League of Shadows arrive and demand the antidote. Fries and Bridgit begin to fend off the assassins when Gordon and Bullock arrive to kill many of them but then, Gordon accidentally kills Fish, causing her to drop the antidotes, shattering them. She dies on Cobblepot's arms. Seeing no choice, Strange then suggests using Tetch's (Benedict Samuel) blood as a way to make a new antidote. However, Barbara, Tabitha and Butch intercept his transfer van and take Tetch.

Bruce finally discovers the building and enters a secret passage to a hallway filled with assassins from the League. They guide him to a room that contains a glowing pool and a man (Alexander Siddig) waiting for him. The man replies that the Shaman fulfilled his job and introduces himself as the "Demon's Head": Ra's al Ghul. Ra's explains that he's been alive for a very long time and that he is looking for a new heir: Bruce. To this end, he brings Alfred into the room and orders Bruce to prove his worth by killing Alfred, giving him a sword to do this with. Despite Alfred's pleas, Bruce impales the sword through his chest.

Production

Development
In May 2017, it was announced that the twenty-first episode of the season will be titled "Destiny Calling" and was to be written by Danny Cannon and directed by Nathan Hope.

Casting
Camren Bicondova, Maggie Geha, and Michael Chiklis don't appear in the episode as their respective characters. In May 2017, it was announced that the guest cast for the episode would include Jada Pinkett Smith as Fish Mooney, Alexander Siddig as Ra's al Ghul, Camila Perez as Bridgit Pike/Firefly, Nathan Darrow as Victor Fries/Mr. Freeze, and B. D. Wong as Hugo Strange.

Reception

Viewers
Airing back to back with the next episode, the episode was watched by 3.17 million viewers with a 1.0/4 share among adults aged 18 to 49. This was a 4% increase in viewership from the previous episode, which was watched by 3.03 million viewers with a 1.0/4 in the 18-49 demographics. With this rating, Gotham ranked third on its timeslot and third for the night behind The Bachelorette, and a NHL game.

References

External links 
 

Gotham (season 3) episodes
2017 American television episodes